Heracleum sosnowskyi, or Sosnowsky's hogweed, is a monocarpic perennial herbaceous flowering plant in the carrot family Apiaceae. Its native range includes the central and eastern Caucasus regions of Eurasia and extends into the southern Caucasus region called Transcaucasia. The native ranges of Heracleum sosnowskyi and Heracleum mantegazzianum, a close relative, overlap in the Caucasus region. Sosnowsky's hogweed is now a common weed in the Baltic States, Belarus, Russia, Ukraine, and Poland.

Early botanists considered H. sosnowskyi to be a subspecies of H. mantegazzianum. Sosnowski's hogweed was described as a separate species by Ida P. Mandenova in 1944. The species is named in honor of the Russian botanist Dmitrii Ivanovich Sosnowsky (1885–1952), who found the species in Georgia in 1936.

Description

The root is very firm, up to  diameter. The inflorescence is a big umbel found at the end of every stem. It blooms during July through September and produces thousands of seeds. They are easily distributed by the wind, but especially by the water.

Sosnowsky's hogweed is a monocarpic perennial, that is, after a mature plant flowers and produces seed, the entire plant including the root will die.

Invasiveness status 
In Europe, Sosnowsky's hogweed is included since 2016 in the list of Invasive Alien Species of Union concern (the Union list). This implies that this species cannot be imported, cultivated, transported, commercialized, planted, or intentionally released into the environment in the whole of the European Union.

Public health and safety

All parts of H. sosnowskyi contain phototoxic furanocoumarins. It is dangerous for humans because even small drops of plant's juice cause skin photosensitivity and burns. The plant is less dangerous for animals that have thick hair to protect them from the sun.

Control measures
The plant was common only in the Caucasus area, until it started to be used as a silage plant in other parts of the Soviet Union. As a result, it quickly spread in many areas of Russia, Belarus, and Ukraine. It is now a highly invasive plant in the Baltic States, Russia, Poland, and Belarus. Many river valleys and roadsides are occupied by large stands of this weed. It is difficult to eradicate because the seeds remain viable for many years and the roots are difficult to remove. Herbicides are widely used in a fight against it, but the plant can later resprout from the roots.

The plant is also used as a shield-hedge along the roads, preventing farm animals from escaping and wild animals from getting in.

The decision to use the plant for silage was made in 1947, under Stalin's rule, so when the species later proved to be highly invasive and difficult to remove, people started to call it "Stalin's revenge".

See also
 Heracleum, the genus
 Other tall invasive Heracleum species: Heracleum mantegazzianum and Heracleum persicum
 Non-invasive Heracleum species: Heracleum sphondylium and Heracleum maximum
 Species that can be mistaken for Heracleum sosnowskyi: wild parsnip, garden angelica, wild angelica

References

External links

Apioideae
Plants described in 1970